Love Stuff is the debut studio album by American singer and songwriter Elle King. It was released physically and digitally in the United States on February 13, 2015, and on vinyl on March 3, 2015, through RCA Records. The album was mastered by Stephen Marcussen at Marcussen Mastering, which is located in Hollywood, California.

The album was preceded by its lead single "Ex's & Oh's", which was released on September 23, 2014, and has since peaked at No. 10 on the Billboard Hot 100. It has since been certified double Platinum. "Ex's & Oh's" reached the top of the Alternative Songs chart in September 2015, becoming only the second song by a solo female to reach the top since 1996 after Lorde achieved the feat in 2013 with "Royals". It was also preceded by the promotional single "Under the Influence". The album's second single "America's Sweetheart" was also a commercial success it peaked at no.10 on the Hot Rock & Alternative Songs (Billboard) becoming her second song to do so, it has since been certified platinum in Canada.

The album made history by being the first ever number 1 album on the UK Americana chart, which launched on 28 January 2016. It also was placed No. 2 on UK Biggest Americana Albums of 2016 and has since been certified platinum in the United States.

Composition
Love Stuff blends elements of folk, gospel, R&B, and punk-pop.

Singles
"Ex's & Oh's" was released on September 23, 2014, as the album's lead single. It first found success in the rock genre, where it became the second song by a solo female artist in the past twenty years to reach the top position of the Billboard Alternative Songs airplay chart and led the magazine's Hot Rock Songs chart for 10 consecutive weeks in mid-2015. The song later crossed over to a mainstream audience and became a number-one hit on the Adult Pop Songs chart in addition to spending one week in the top 10 of the all-genre Billboard Hot 100. "Ex's & Oh's" received two nominations at the 58th Grammy Awards: for Best Rock Performance and Best Rock Song.

The second rock single from the album is "Under the Influence", released to AAA radio on December 14, 2015 modern rock radio on December 15.

"America's Sweetheart" was released on February 8, 2016, as the second mainstream single and third overall released from Love Stuff; it impacted American hot adult contemporary radio on that date.

Critical reception

Marcus Floyd from Renowned for Sound was impressed by King's "sonically versatile qualities" in her vocal performance over the track listing and the lyrical content she co-wrote with her collaborators, saying that "it’s great to hear less clichéd written tracks, replaced by personal pieces that tell a story and relive an experience." He concluded that King's career was just beginning, saying that "with her debut album now under her belt, she seems capable of anything; we can’t wait to hear more from this girl." AllMusic's Stephen Thomas Erlewine was critical of King's vocals feeling exhaustive throughout the album as she keeps up her chosen image but gave praise to her performances on "Ex's & Oh's", "Under the Influence", "Last Damn Night" and "Jackson" for finding a balance between "rock crunch and soul testifying," concluding that "Such highlights suggests that when [Elle] King doesn't have to try so hard to prove her bona fides, she might wind up with a record that's hard to deny. For now, she merely has a promising debut on her hands."

Track listing

Personnel
Adapted from AllMusic:

Vocals
Lead vocals – Elle King, Jacknife Lee
Background vocals – Zach Carothers, Scarlet Cherry, John Gourley, Martin Johnson, Tyler Sam Johnson, Elle King, Phillip Lawrence, Kyle O'Quin, Alisan Porter

Instruments

Banjo – Elle King
Bass – Dave Bassett, Jacknife Lee, Brandon Paddock, Mark Ronson, Sebastian Steinberg
Bouzouki – Blake Mills
Drums, percussion, and beats – Dave Bassett, Sam Bell, Jeff Bhasker, Patrick Carney, Zach Carothers, James Gadson, John Gourley, John Hill, Martin Johnson, Patrick Keeler, Elle King, Jacknife Lee, Kyle O'Quin, Darren Weiss
Guitars – Dave Bassett, Martin Johnson, Elle King, Jacknife Lee, Blake Mills, Hunter Perrin, Mark Ronson, Eg White
Keyboards – Dave Bassett, Jeff Bhasker, John Hill, Jacknife Lee
Organ – Jeff Bhasker, Jacknife Lee, Jamie Muhoberac, Kyle O'Quin
Piano – Jeff Bhasker, Martin Johnson, Jacknife Lee, Jamie Muhoberac, Kyle O'Quin, Brandon Paddock
Synthesizer – John Hill

Production

A&R – Peter Edge, David Wolter
Assistant – Marcus Johnson, Kyle Moorman, Alex Salibian, Joe Visciano
Digital editing – Chris Bernard, Matt Bishop
Engineering – Dave Bassett, Sam Bell, Mark Bengtson, Matt Bishop, Doug Boehm, Tyler Sam Johnson, Jacknife Lee, Matt Ross, Alex Salibian, Pawel Sek, Laura Sisk, Eg White
Mastering – Stephen Marcussen
Mixing – Jeff Bhasker, Michael H. Brauer, Tom Elmhirst,  Martin Johnson, Vance Powell, Alex Salibian, Eg White
Mixing assistant – Mark Bengtson
Producer – Dave Bassett, Jeff Bhasker, John Hill, Martin Johnson, Jacknife Lee, Eg White
Production assistant – Ben Baptie, Tyler Sam Johnson, Brandon Paddock
Programming – John Hill, Martin Johnson, Kyle Moorman, Brandon Paddock

Imagery
Art direction – Erwin Gorostiza, Michelle Holme
Design – Michelle Holme
Photography – Dustin Cohen

Charts and certifications

Weekly charts

Year-end charts

Certifications

References

2015 debut albums
Elle King albums
RCA Records albums
Albums produced by Eg White
Albums produced by John Hill (record producer)
Albums produced by Jeff Bhasker
Albums produced by Jacknife Lee
Albums produced by Martin Johnson (musician)